William Thomas Heron (January 3, 1897 – July 18, 1988) was a professor of psychology at the University of Minnesota. He co-authored six papers with B.F. Skinner in the 1930s, making him Skinner's most frequent co-author during the latter's career. He is known for an experiment he conducted in 1952, in which he and a graduate student attempted to test the validity of extrasensory perception.

References

1897 births
1988 deaths
University of Minnesota faculty
20th-century American psychologists
Experimental psychologists
University of Chicago alumni